The Prix Dentan is a Swiss literary award created in 1984 and named for Professor Michel Dentan.

Laureates 
 2021 Bruno Pellegrino for Dans la ville provisoire, Zoé, 2021
 2020 Pascal Janovjak for Le Zoo de Rome, Actes Sud, 2019
 2019 Rinny Gremaud pour Un monde en toc, Seuil, 2018
 2018 Jean François Billeter for Une autre Aurélia et Une Rencontre à Pékin, Allia, 2017
 2017 Claude Tabarini for Rue des Gares et autres lieux rêvés, Héros-Limite, 2016
 2016 David Bosc for Mourir et puis sauter sur son cheval, Verdier, 2016
 2015 Antoinette Rychner for Le Prix, Paris, 2015
 2014 Philippe Rahmy for Béton armé - Shanghai au cors à corps, Paris, La Table Ronde, 2013
 2013 Jean-Pierre Rochat for L'écrivain suisse allemand, Geneva, éditions d’Autre Part, 2012
 2012 Not awarded (lack of agreement between the members of the jury)
 2011 Co-laureates
 Douna Loup, for L'Embrasure, Paris, Mercure de France, 2010, 
 Alexandre Friederich, for Ogrorog, Meyrin, éditions des sauvages, 2011
 2010 Noëlle Revaz, for Efina, Paris, Éditions Gallimard, 2009
 2009 Jean-Bernard Vuillème, for Pléthore ressuscité, Neuchâtel, Editions de la Nouvelle Revue neuchâteloise, 2008
 2008 Co-laureates
 Ghislaine Dunant, for Un effondrement, Paris, Éditions Grasset, 2007, 
 Jean-François Haas, for Dans la gueule de la baleine guerre, Paris, Seuil, 2007.
 2007 Catherine Safonoff, Autour de ma mère, Geneva, Zoé, 2007
 2006 Anne-Lou Steininger, Les Contes des jours volés, Bernard Campiche editeur, 2006, 
 2005 Jean-Luc Benoziglio, Louis Capet, suite et fin, Seuil, 2005.
 2004 Jean-Michel Olivier, for L'enfant secret, Lausanne, L'Age d'homme, 2004.
 2003 Michel Layaz, for Les larmes de ma mère, Geneva Zoé, 2003.
 2002 Etienne Barilier, for L'énigme, Geneva, Zoé, 2001.
 2001 Jean-Jacques Langendorf, for La nuit tombe, Dieu regarde, Geneva, Zoé, 2000.
 2000 Frédérik Pajak, for L'immense solitude. Avec Friedrich Nietzsche et Cesare Pavese, orphelins sous le ciel de Turin, Paris, Presses Universitaires de France, 1999.
 1999 Claude Darbellay, for Les prétendants, Zoé, 1998.
 1998 Daniel Maggetti, for Chambre 112, L'Aire, 1997.
 1997 Claudine Roulet, for Rien qu'une écaille, Sierre, Monographic, 1996.
 1996 Co-laureates 
 Ivan Farron, for Un après-midi avec Wackernagel, Geneva, Zoé, 1995, 
 Pascale Kramer, for Manu", Paris, Calmann-Lévy, 1995. 
 1995 Elisabeth Horem, for Le ring, Yvonand, Bernard Campiche, 1994.
 1994 Daniel de Roulet, for Virtuellement vôtre, Dole (F) / Saint-Imier (CH), Canevas Editeur, 1993.
 1993 Yves Laplace, for On, Paris, Éditions du Seuil, 1992.
 1992 Silvia Ricci-Lempen, for Un homme tragique, Lausanne, L'Aire, 1991.
 1991 Jean Pache, for La straniera, Geneva, Zoé, 1990.
 1990 François Debluë, for Troubles fêtes, Lausanne, L'Age d'homme, 1989.
 1989 Rose-Marie Pagnard, for La période Fernandez, Arles, Actes Sud, 1988, and Sans eux la vie serait un désert, Lausanne, L'Aire, 1988.
 1988 Marie-Claire Dewarrat, for Carême, Lausanne, L'Aire, 1987.
 1987 Claude Delarue, for La mosaïque, Paris, Seuil, 1986.
 1985 Jean-Marc Lovay, for Le convoi du colonel Fürst, Geneva, Éditions de Zoé, 1985.
 1984 Jacqueline Tanner, for La Maryssée, Lausanne, L'Aire, 1984.

References 

Swiss literary awards
Awards established in 1984
1984 establishments in Switzerland